Thisbe, minor planet designation 88 Thisbe, is the 13th largest main-belt asteroid. It was discovered by C. H. F. Peters on June 15, 1866, and named after Thisbe, heroine of a Roman fable. An occultation of a star by Thisbe was observed on October 7, 1981. Results from the occultation indicate a larger than expected diameter of 232 km.

During 2000, 88 Thisbe was observed by radar from the Arecibo Observatory. The return signal matched an effective diameter of 207 ± 22 km. This is consistent with the asteroid dimensions computed through other means.

Photometric observations of this asteroid during 1977 gave a light curve with a period of 6.0422 ± 0.006 hours and a brightness variation of 0.19 in magnitude.

Perturbation

Thisbe has been perturbed by asteroid 7 Iris and in 2001 Michalak estimated it to have a mass of 15 kg.  But Iris is strongly perturbed by many minor planets such as 10 Hygiea and 15 Eunomia.

In 2008, Baer estimated Thisbe to have a mass of 10.5 kg. In 2011 Baer revised this to 18.3 kg with an uncertainty of 1.1 kg.

References

External links
 
 

Background asteroids
Thisbe
Thisbe
CF-type asteroids (Tholen)
B-type asteroids (SMASS)
18660615